ι Telescopii, Latinized as Iota Telescopii and abbreviated iot Tel, is a solitary star in the southern constellation of Telescopium. It is visible to the naked eye as a faint, orange-hued point of light with an apparent visual magnitude of +4.89. The star is located approximately 347 light years from the Sun based on parallax, and is drifting further away with a radial velocity of +22 km/s.

This object is an aging K-type giant star with a stellar classification of K0 III, which indicates it has exhausted the supply of hydrogen at its core then cooled and expanded. At present it has 1.19 times the mass of the Sun, but 19 times the radius of the Sun It is radiating 157 times the Sun's luminosity from its swollen photosphere at an effective temperature of 4,680 K. Iota Telescopii has a low projected rotational velocity of 1.8 km/s, and has a near solar metallicity.

References

K-type giants
Telescopii, Iota
Telescopium (constellation)
Durchmusterung objects
184127
096341
7424